László Bojtor (born 17 September 1985 in Budapest) is a Hungarian football (forward) player who plays for Egri FC.

External links 
HLSZ 

1985 births
Living people
Footballers from Budapest
Hungarian footballers
Association football forwards
Budapest Honvéd FC players
FC Felcsút players
BFC Siófok players
Vecsés FC footballers
Egri FC players
Nemzeti Bajnokság I players